Matauri Bay is a bay in New Zealand, situated 30 km north of Kerikeri, in Whangaroa county, just north of the Bay of Islands. It has over a kilometre of white sand and crystal clear water, making it a popular summer destinations for surfers, divers, fishers and holidaymakers.

History and culture

Early history

Some of the first Polynesian navigators to New Zealand landed at Matauri Bay. It was a site of early Māori contact with Europeans, such as with the missionary Samuel Marsden in 1814.

Rainbow Warrior

The Rainbow Warrior was given a final resting place near Matauri Bay, at the Cavalli Islands. It has become a living reef, attracting marine life and recreational divers.

The idea was first proposed by the New Zealand Underwater Association. It seemed a fitting end for a ship that had spent its time protecting the marine environment.

It was towed north with a patched hull on 2 December 1987. Ten days later, a crowd of well-wishers looked on as it was given a traditional Māori burial. Now home to a complex ecosystem, the Rainbow Warrior has become a popular dive destination. The local Māori community maintains its guardianship and conservation. In a few years, the Rainbow Warrior became an integral part of the environment it helped protect.

Marae

The Matauri Bay area has two marae. Mātauri or Te Tāpui Marae and Ngāpuhi meeting house is a meeting place of the Ngāpuhi hapū of Ngāti Kura and Ngāti Miru, and the Ngāpuhi / Ngāti Kahu ki Whaingaroa hapū of Ngāti Kura. Te Ngaere Marae and Ngāi Tupango te Hapū meeting house is a meeting place of the Ngāpuhi / Ngāti Kahu ki Whaingaroa hapū of Ngaitupango.

Demographics
The SA1 area is part of the larger Whakarara statistical area.

The SA1 statistical area had a population of 201 at the 2018 New Zealand census, an increase of 51 people (34.0%) since the 2013 census, and an increase of 66 people (48.9%) since the 2006 census. There were 54 households, comprising 99 males and 99 females, giving a sex ratio of 1.0 males per female. The median age was 33.1 years (compared with 37.4 years nationally), with 42 people (20.9%) aged under 15 years, 57 (28.4%) aged 15 to 29, 84 (41.8%) aged 30 to 64, and 18 (9.0%) aged 65 or older.

Ethnicities were 32.8% European/Pākehā, 88.1% Māori, 6.0% Pacific peoples, and 4.5% Asian. People may identify with more than one ethnicity.

Of those people who chose to answer the census's question about religious affiliation, 44.8% had no religion, 25.4% were Christian, 23.9% had Māori religious beliefs, and 1.5% had other religions.

Of those at least 15 years old, 12 (7.5%) people had a bachelor's or higher degree, and 39 (24.5%) people had no formal qualifications. The median income was $20,900, compared with $31,800 nationally. 12 people (7.5%) earned over $70,000 compared to 17.2% nationally. The employment status of those at least 15 was that 63 (39.6%) people were employed full-time, 36 (22.6%) were part-time, and 12 (7.5%) were unemployed.

Whakarara statistical area
Whakarara statistical area covers the area east of Whangaroa Harbour.

Whakarara had a population of 1,344 at the 2018 New Zealand census, an increase of 318 people (31.0%) since the 2013 census, and an increase of 240 people (21.7%) since the 2006 census. There were 465 households, comprising 663 males and 678 females, giving a sex ratio of 0.98 males per female. The median age was 45.2 years (compared with 37.4 years nationally), with 273 people (20.3%) aged under 15 years, 207 (15.4%) aged 15 to 29, 588 (43.8%) aged 30 to 64, and 273 (20.3%) aged 65 or older.

Ethnicities were 56.7% European/Pākehā, 58.9% Māori, 4.2% Pacific peoples, 1.8% Asian, and 1.3% other ethnicities. People may identify with more than one ethnicity.

The percentage of people born overseas was 11.4, compared with 27.1% nationally.

Of those people who chose to answer the census's question about religious affiliation, 43.3% had no religion, 35.0% were Christian, 11.4% had Māori religious beliefs, 0.2% were Hindu, 0.4% were Buddhist and 0.7% had other religions.

Of those at least 15 years old, 126 (11.8%) people had a bachelor's or higher degree, and 249 (23.2%) people had no formal qualifications. The median income was $21,900, compared with $31,800 nationally. 87 people (8.1%) earned over $70,000 compared to 17.2% nationally. The employment status of those at least 15 was that 387 (36.1%) people were employed full-time, 198 (18.5%) were part-time, and 57 (5.3%) were unemployed.

Education

Matauri Bay School is a contributing primary (years 1-6) school with a roll of  students as of  It opened in 1954.

Te Kura Kaupapa Māori o Whangaroa is a composite (years 1-13) school with a roll of  students as of 
It is a Kura Kaupapa Māori school which teaches fully in the Māori language.

Both schools are coeducational.

A Māori school was established at Te Ngaere in 1876, but student numbers fluctuated as local people moved to seek an income on the gumfields. In 1890, attendance at the school ceased, and the building was dragged to the top of the hill by a bullock team to make it more accessible. Changing its name to Whakarara School, it remained open until Matauri Bay School replaced it.

Notes

Far North District
Populated places in the Northland Region
Bays of the Northland Region